The 2022 USA Cross Country Championships was the 131st edition of the USA Cross Country Championships. The USA Cross Country Championships took place in San Diego, California, on 8 January 2022 and served as the US Trials for 5th edition of 2022 Pan American Cross Country Cup (6 member teams) in Serra, Espírito Santo, Brazil. The men's race was won by Shadrack Kipchirchir in 30:32. The women's race was won by Alicia Monson in a time of 34:01. The junior (U-20) men's race was won by Gabe Simonsen in 25:42. The junior (U-20) women's race was won by Zariel Macchia in a time of 22:50.

Results 
Race results

Men

Women

U-20 Men

U-20 Women

External links
USA Cross Country
2022 USA Cross Country results

References

2022
USA Cross Country Championships
USA Cross Country Championships
USA Cross Country Championships
USA Cross Country Championships
Sports competitions in San Diego